Canova may refer to:

People 
 Antonio Canova (1757–1822), Venetian sculptor
 Francesco Canova da Milano (1497–1543), Italian lutenist and composer
 Frank J. Canova (born 1956), Inventor of the smartphone
 Gaudenz Canova (1887–1962), Swiss politician
 Judy Canova (1913–1983), American comedian, actress, singer and radio personality
 Renato Canova (born 1944), Italian athletics coach
 Tim Canova (born 1960), American law professor

Places
 Canova, New Mexico, an unincorporated community in Rio Arriba County, New Mexico
 Canova, South Dakota, a town in Miner County
 Canova, Virginia, an unincorporated community in Prince William County
 Canova, is a locality, in the comune of Galzignano Terme

Things
 6256 Canova, an asteroid